The 1957 Open Championship was held at the Lansdowne Club in London from 20 March - 25 March. Roshan Khan won the title defeating Hashim Khan in the final. This was the first ever defeat for Hashim Khan in the open championships.

Another Khan appeared, this time in the form of 17-year-old Mo Khan, nephew of Hashim Khan and Azam Khan.

Seeds

Results

+ amateur
^ seeded

References

Men's British Open Squash Championships
Men's British Open Championship
Men's British Open Squash Championship
Men's British Open Squash Championship
Men's British Open Squash Championship
Squash competitions in London